Transeuropa or TransEuropa or Trans-Europa or variation, may refer to:

 TransEuropa (board game), a board game published by Rio Grande games
 Transeuropa Compañía de Aviación (Trans-Europa), a former charter airline from Spain that operated from 1965 until 1982.
 , a Hansa-class ferry originally built by Stocznia Gdanska, Poland
 Transeuropa Ferries, ferries between Ostend, Belgium and Ramsgate, England
 Transeuropa Festival, an annual festival of culture, arts and politics held simultaneously in different European cities.
 Transeuropa (Theater festival), a triennial theater festival in Germany organized in cooperation with the University of Hildesheim

See also

 Europa (disambiguation)
 Trans (disambiguation)
 Trans Euro Trail (TET) a motorcycle backpacking trail
 Air Transport Europe (ICAO airline code: EAT; callsign: TRANS EUROPE), a Slovakian airline
 Trans Europe Foot Race, a multiday ultramarathon across Europe
 Trans Europe Halles (TEH), a trans-European network of cultural centres
 
 
 Trans Europ Express (disambiguation)
 Transeuropean (disambiguation)
 Pan-European (disambiguation)